Streptomyces laculatispora is a bacterium species from the genus of Streptomyces which has been isolated from soil from the Cockle Park Experimantol Farm in Northumberland in the United Kingdom.

See also 
 List of Streptomyces species

References

Further reading

External links
Type strain of Streptomyces laculatispora at BacDive -  the Bacterial Diversity Metadatabase

laculatispora
Bacteria described in 2012